Krisztián Tamás (born 18 April 1995) is a Hungarian professional footballer currently playing for OTP Bank Liga club Budapest Honvéd in Hungary.

Club career
Tamás played for the youth academy of  Szombathelyi Haladas till 2011. Then he went a trial with Italian heavyweights AC Milan. Other European clubs like Arsenal and Tottenham Hotspur were reportedly interested in securing his services. But Tamás successfully joined the youth academy of AC Milan.

Varese
On 27 July 2014, he joined Serie B team Varese on a season long loan. He made his debut in a Coppa Italia match against Juve Stabia.

Slavia Prague
On 30 January 2015, Tamás was loaned to Slavia Praha ona 6-month deal.

On 21 February 2015, Tamás played his first match with Slavia against Slovan Liberec at the Stadion u Nisy, in Liberec, Czech Republic in the 2014–15 Czech First League.

Club statistics

Updated to games played as of 15 May 2022.

International career
He was also part of the Hungarian U-19 at the 2014 UEFA European Under-19 Championship and  U-20 team at the 2015 FIFA U-20 World Cup.

References

External links
 

1995 births
Living people
Association football defenders
Hungarian footballers
A.C. Milan players
S.S.D. Varese Calcio players
SK Slavia Prague players
Spezia Calcio players
Gyirmót FC Győr players
Fehérvár FC players
Zalaegerszegi TE players
Budapest Honvéd FC players
Serie B players
Czech First League players
Nemzeti Bajnokság I players
Hungary youth international footballers
Hungary under-21 international footballers
Hungarian expatriate footballers
Expatriate footballers in Italy
Expatriate footballers in the Czech Republic
Hungarian expatriate sportspeople in Italy
Hungarian expatriate sportspeople in the Czech Republic
Footballers from Budapest